Trout Lake is a lake that is located south of Averys Place, New York. Fish species present in the lake are pickerel, white sucker, yellow perch, and brown bullhead. There is access by trail from County Route 10. No motors are allowed on the lake.

References

Lakes of New York (state)
Lakes of Hamilton County, New York